Muhammad Ali Khan Bhutto is a Pakistani politician who had been a Member of the Provincial Assembly of Sindh, from May 2013 to May 2018.

Early life and education
He was born on 5 June 1966 in Garhi Khuda Bakhsh.

He has degree of Bachelors of Arts from Shah Abdul Latif University.

Political career

He was elected to the Provincial Assembly of Sindh as a candidate of Pakistan Peoples Party from Constituency PS-37 LARKANA-III in 2013 Pakistani general election.

References

Living people
Sindh MPAs 2013–2018
1966 births
Pakistan People's Party politicians